The Traverse Bay Blues Rugby Football Club (Traverse Bay Blues RFC) is a rugby union team founded in 1973 from Traverse City, Michigan that is a part of the Grand Traverse Rugby Club. It is a member of USA Rugby, Division III Midwest Rugby Eastern Conference, Northern League, and Division III of the Michigan Rugby Football Union. It holds the Cherry Pit Rugby 15's Tournament annually in August and has over 200 members.

Notable players
Phil Thiel Hooker/Prop for the USA Eagles 2008-2011, 2013–Present
Tony Dell'Acqua  All Army Selects 89-91; Combined Services 90'
Cornel Olivier  South African born/ All Midwest Select 2000
Jack Weathers All Marine Selects 88-90; Combined Services 90, 91'
Coen Stassen  South African Born/ All Midwest Select 2002
Dan Farrier All Army Sevens 2008
Bob Brick Founder 1973

External links
Traverse Bay Blues RFC Website

Rugby union teams in Michigan